Paterson Caledonian was an American soccer club based in Paterson, New Jersey that was a member of the professional American Soccer League.

The club joined the ASL two months into the 1936/37 season, when they took over the Newark Germans and moved the team to Paterson.

Before the 1938/39 season, the club moved to Trenton, absorbed the amateur Trenton Highlanders club, and took their name.

Year-by-year

Defunct soccer clubs in New Jersey
American Soccer League (1933–1983) teams
1938 disestablishments in New Jersey
Association football clubs disestablished in 1938

nl:Paterson Caledonian